Cantina Laredo is a Mexican restaurant chain headquartered in Dallas, Texas that is owned by Consolidated Restaurant Operations, Inc. The company was founded in 1984. The main training restaurant is located in Frisco, Texas.

Mexican restaurants in the United States
Restaurants in Texas
Restaurant chains